Iran participated in the 2011 Asian Winter Games in Almaty and Astana, Kazakhstan from January 30, 2011 to February 6, 2011.

Competitors

Medal summary

Medal table

Medalists

Results by event

Ski orienteering

Men

Skiing

Alpine

Men

Women

Cross-country

Men

References

External links
 Official website

Nations at the 2011 Asian Winter Games
Asian Winter Games
2011